Niki Rikhard Tuuli (born 26 October 1995) is a Finnish motorcycle rider.

Career
Between 2013 and 2015 he competed in the Superstock 600 series before moving up to the Supersport World Championship as a full-time rider in 2017. He competed as a wild-card entry in 2016 scoring podiums in all three races he participated.

After Zulfahmi Khairuddin retired from the sport, he replaced him in the SIC Racing Team to join the 2018 Moto2 World Championship.

Career statistics

Supersport World Championship

Races by year
(key) (Races in bold indicate pole position; races in italics indicate fastest lap)

Grand Prix motorcycle racing

By season

By class

Races by year
(key) (Races in bold indicate pole position; races in italics indicate fastest lap)

FIM CEV Moto2 European Championship

Races by year
(key) (Races in bold indicate pole position; races in italics indicate fastest lap)

References

External links

 
 

1995 births
Living people
Finnish motorcycle racers
Supersport World Championship riders
Moto2 World Championship riders
People from Myrskylä
MotoE World Cup riders
Sportspeople from Uusimaa